(Cyclooctatetraene)iron tricarbonyl is the organoiron compound with the formula (C8H8)Fe(CO)3.  Like other examples of (diene)Fe(CO)3 complexes, it is an orange, diamagnetic solid.  Although several isomers are possible, only the η4-C8H8 complex is observed.  The complex is an example of a ring-whizzer, since, on the NMR time-scale, the Fe(CO)3 center migrates around the rim of the cyclooctatetraene ligand.

References

Carbonyl complexes
Organoiron compounds
Half sandwich compounds
Iron(0) compounds